William Griesinger  (June 20, 1895 – April 16, 1978) was a politician in Ontario, Canada. He was a Progressive Conservative member of the  Legislative Assembly of Ontario from 1945 to 1959 who represented the southwestern riding of Windsor—Sandwich. He was a cabinet minister in the governments of George Drew, Thomas Kennedy and Leslie Frost.

Background
He was born in Windsor, Ontario, the son of Lewis Griesinger. In 1934, he married Mary Adele Allen, with whom he raised daughter Rosemary and adopted son William. He was owner and general manager of the Windsor Lumber Company. Griesinger served with the Canadian Expeditionary Force during World War I, reaching the rank of major, and was awarded the Military Cross at the Battle of Vimy Ridge. After the war, he continued to serve with the local militia and was made commander The Essex and Kent Scottish with the lieutenant-colonel. During World War II he was an area commandant and after the war continued to serve as honorary commander until 1971.

Politics
Griesinger was elected in the 1945 provincial election, in the riding of Windsor—Sandwich. He defeated CCF incumbent George Bennett by 3,042 votes. He was re-elected three times until he was defeated by Liberal Maurice Bélanger in 1959. He served in the provincial cabinets of George Drew, Thomas Kennedy as a Minister Without Portfolio. He served as Chief Commissioner of the Liquor Control Board of Ontario from 1948 to 1949. In 1949, Leslie Frost appointed him as Minister of Planning and Development. In 1953 he was appointed as Minister of Public Works. As minister of Public Works he directed the commencement of construction of Highway 401 at the western end.

He resigned from the provincial cabinet in 1958 after he was implicated in a stock trading scandal involving Northern Ontario Natural Gas, a natural gas company. Specifically, Premier Leslie Frost had ordered all members of his Cabinet to divest themselves of shares in the company but Griesinger did not do so. Later, Premier Frost described Griesinger's involvement in the matter as a "minor indiscretion".

Cabinet posts

References

External links 
 

1895 births
1978 deaths
Members of the Executive Council of Ontario
Politicians from Windsor, Ontario
Progressive Conservative Party of Ontario MPPs